Nguyễn Đức Nhân (3 February 1989) is a Vietnamese footballer who plays as a central midfielder for Đồng Nai

References

1989 births
Living people
Vietnamese footballers
V.League 1 players
Dong Nai FC players
People from Đồng Nai Province
Association football midfielders